Dan Kamyar Ahdoot is an American actor, writer, and comedian. He is known for his TV appearances on Netflix's Cobra Kai,  Disney's Kickin' It, Showtime's Shameless, and the Seeso series Bajillion Dollar Propertie$. He has also developed TV shows for CBS, Fox, Hulu, Freeform, and Pop.

Early life
Ahdoot is ethnically an Iranian Jew, hailing from Great Neck, New York. Speaking on his upbringing, he said: "I grew up in Great Neck, New York, which is actually a hotbed of Iranian Jewry, so I didn't really know that I was very different until I went to college." He completed pre-med studies at Johns Hopkins University, and was accepted into medical school, but ultimately decided to pursue stand-up comedy instead.

Career
Ahdoot has developed television shows for CBS, FOX, Hulu, Freeform, and Pop! He has also written for various Comedy Central Roasts.

Ahdoot is best known for his work on the series Bajillion Dollar Propertie$ where he played the ruthless real estate agent Amir Yaghoob.  He has also acted on Showtime's Shameless, ABC's Super Fun Night, and Falafel Phil on the Disney XD show Kickin' It. Ahdoot was also in an episode of Workaholics playing a worker at a computer store.

Ahdoot performs regularly at the Laugh Factory in Hollywood, and is a national headlining comedian. He has performed on The Tonight Show, NBC's Last Comic Standing, Last Call with Carson Daly, and Comedy Central's Premium Blend.

Ahdoot is the host of the food podcast Green Eggs and Dan.  He has been a guest on Spontaneanation with Paul F. Tompkins and Comedy Bang! Bang! with Scott Aukerman.

Discography

hate me, or HATE ME (2006)

Filmography

Films

Television

References

External links 
 
 
 

American stand-up comedians
Iranian Jews
American Mizrahi Jews
Johns Hopkins University alumni
Living people
People from Great Neck, New York
American people of Iranian-Jewish descent
Iranian stand-up comedians
Jewish American male comedians
Year of birth missing (living people)
21st-century American Jews